Ziminella salmonacea, common name the salmon aeolis,  is a species of sea slug, an aeolid nudibranch, a marine gastropod mollusc in the family Paracoryphellidae.

Distribution
This species occurs in the Arctic seas; (Greenland, Iceland, Spitsbergen, North Pacific (Bering Strait, Point Barrow, Alaska, British Columbia), the Western Atlantic (Cape Cod (Mass.) north to Halifax (Nova Scotia)) and the Eastern Atlantic and northern European waters (north coast of Norway).

Description
The white, translucent, broad body of this species reaches a length between 25 and 50 mm, and ends in a thin, tapered tail. The cerata are swollen with a thin orange or pink digestive gland duct. There are opaque white markings at the tips of the cerata and on the outer parts of the rhinophores and oral tentacles. An orange color variation may occur, caused by a diet of anemones rather than ascidians. This was previously considered to be a distinct species, Coryphella stimpsoni. The maximum recorded length is 50 mm.

Ecology 
These sea slugs can be found consuming the colonial tunicate Amaroucium constellatum Verrill, 1871 which is an unusual diet for an aeolid nudibranch. Juveniles have been found feeding on hydroids, especially Tubularia. The salmon aeolis, like other nudibranchs, is a simultaneous hermaphrodite with reciprocal mating and sperm storage. They lay their eggs in a long, twisted, gelatinous mass.

References

Further reading 
 Linkletter, L.E., 1977. A checklist of marine fauna and flora of the Bay of Fundy. Huntsman Marine Laboratory, St. Andrews, N.B. 68 p
 Turgeon, D.D., et al. 1998. Common and scientific names of aquatic invertebrates of the United States and Canada. American Fisheries Society Special Publication 26
 Trott, T.J., 2004. Cobscook Bay inventory: a historical checklist of marine invertebrates spanning 162 years. Northeastern Naturalist (Special Issue 2): 261 - 324
 Kuzirian, A.M. 1977. The rediscovery and biology of Coryphella nobilis Verrill, 1880 in New England (Gastropoda: Opisthobranchia). Journal of Molluscan Studies 43(3):230-240.
 Kuzirian, A.M., 1979. Taxonomy and biology of four New England coryphellid nudibranchs. Journal of Molluscan Studies, 45: 239-261

Paracoryphellidae
Gastropods described in 1838